The light flyweight class in the boxing at the 1996 Summer Olympics competition was the lightest class at the 1996 Summer Olympics in Atlanta, Georgia. The weight class is open for boxers up to 48 kilograms. The competition in the Alexander Memorial Coliseum started on 20 July and ended on 3 August 1996.

Qualified boxers

Medalists

Results

References

External links
amateur-boxing

Flyweight, Light